The Freedom Fighters is a team of comic book superheroes, as published by DC Comics.

The roster of the team has changed a great deal over the years. These roster lists are of the members during the team's various incarnations by team iteration.

The codenames listed under Character are those used during the time frame of the particular iteration. Characters with more than one codename for that period have them listed chronologically and separated by a slash (/). Bolded names in the most recent iteration published are the current team members.

First Appearance is the place where the character first appeared as a member of a particular iteration. It is not necessarily the first appearance of the character in print, nor the story depicting how the character joined the team.

All information is listed in publication order first, then alphabetical.

First roster
This roster covers the iteration of the team introduced in the early 1970s and later modified by retcons in the 1980s.

Second roster
This roster covers the iteration of the team introduced in 2001.

Third roster
This roster covers the iteration of the team introduced in 2006 after Infinite Crisis.

Freedom Fighters